Nicholas Quixote Rogers (May 31, 1979 – May 3, 2010) was an American football linebacker for the National Football League and the Arena Football League. He was drafted in the sixth round of the 2002 NFL Draft. He most recently played for the Colorado Crush of the Arena Football League.

During his professional career, Rogers took the field in the National Football League for the Minnesota Vikings, the Indianapolis Colts, the Green Bay Packers, and the Miami Dolphins. He played college football for the Georgia Tech Yellow Jackets football team.

On May 3, 2010, Rogers died in a single-vehicle automobile accident.

Notes

1979 births
2010 deaths
Road incident deaths in Georgia (U.S. state)
People from East Point, Georgia
American football linebackers
Georgia Tech Yellow Jackets football players
Minnesota Vikings players
Indianapolis Colts players
Green Bay Packers players
Miami Dolphins players
Colorado Crush players
Players of American football from Georgia (U.S. state)
Sportspeople from Fulton County, Georgia